Gabriel Martinez  may refer to:

 Gabriel Martínez (footballer) (born 1958), Colombian football left-back
 Gabriel Martinez (artist) (born 1967), Cuban-American artist
 Gabriel Martínez-Ábrego (born 1998), Mexican motorcycle racer
 Gabri Martínez (born 2003), Spanish football forward
 Gabriel Martinez (politician) (fl. 2008), Belizean politician